Lesbian, gay, bisexual, and transgender (LGBT) persons in the U.S. state of Mississippi face legal challenges and discrimination not experienced by non-LGBT residents. LGBT rights in Mississippi are limited in comparison to other states. Same-sex sexual activity is legal in the state and same-sex marriage has been recognized since June 2015 in accordance with the Supreme Court's decision in Obergefell v. Hodges. State statutes do not address discrimination on the basis of sexual orientation and gender identity; however, the U.S. Supreme Court's ruling in Bostock v. Clayton County established that employment discrimination against LGBT people is illegal under federal law. The state capital Jackson and a number of other cities provide protections in housing and public accommodations as well.

A Deep Southern Bible Belt state, Mississippi is known for being among the most socially conservative states in the country. A 2017 opinion poll showed that Mississippi, alongside Alabama, was one of only two states in the country where opposition to same-sex marriage outnumbered support. Additionally, the state has passed various religious freedom laws designed to protect religious beliefs, though these laws have been criticized for "giving religious people a license to discriminate" against LGBT people and have provoked both domestic and international backlash. Mississippi was also the last state to allow same-sex couples to adopt, finally relenting in May 2016 after a federal judge ruled the adoption ban unconstitutional. Despite this reputation, opinion polls have reported a trend in support for at least some LGBT rights, with a majority of Mississippi residents now favoring an anti-discrimination law covering sexual orientation and gender identity.

Legality of same-sex sexual activity
Mississippi enacted its first criminal provision dealing with sodomy in 1839, which was defined via the common law. The law provided punishment of up to ten years' imprisonment for anal sex (both homosexual and heterosexual). It also applied to private consensual activity. In 1937, in the first sodomy court case in the state, the Supreme Court of Mississippi held, in State v. Hill, that cunnilingus was not a "crime against nature" and thus not criminal. In 1942, the Mississippi Legislature authorized a recodification of state law with that power given to the Attorney General. The Attorney General changed the heading over the sodomy law from "crime against nature" to "unnatural intercourse". Due to this change, the Mississippi Supreme Court ruled in 1955 in State v. Davis that cases of fellatio (oral sex) could also be prosecuted.

The sodomy law was upheld twice as constitutional by the Mississippi Supreme Court, first in State v. Mays in 1976 and then in 1994 in Miller v. State. In 1995, the state passed a "sex offender registration law" requiring those convicted under the sodomy law to register their address with the sheriff and notify any change in address. Additionally, under a 1987 law, employers were permitted to ask the State Attorney General if a potential employee had committed a sex offense, including consensual sodomy.

Same-sex sexual activity has been legal in Mississippi since 2003, when the United States Supreme Court struck down all state sodomy laws in the case of Lawrence v. Texas.

Recognition of same-sex relationships

On August 24, 1996, Governor Kirk Fordice issued an executive order banning same-sex marriage in the state. A statute banning same-sex marriage took effect on February 12, 1997. On November 4, 2004, voters approved a constitutional amendment that defined marriage as the union of one man and one woman.

On November 25, 2014, Carlton W. Reeves, district judge of the U.S. District Court for the Southern District of Mississippi, ruled Mississippi's ban on same-sex marriage unconstitutional, but stayed enforcement of his ruling until December 9. On December 4, the Fifth Circuit Court of Appeals issued a stay pending appeal.

On June 29, 2015, following the ruling of the U.S. Supreme Court on June 26 in Obergefell v. Hodges, Attorney General Jim Hood informed the state's circuit clerks that they could issue marriage licenses to same-sex couples and that refusal to do so might invite lawsuits on the part of those denied licenses.

Adoption and parenting

Mississippi has been required to recognize adoption rights for same-sex couples since a federal court ruling in March 2016 struck down a statutory ban on same-sex couples adopting children jointly. The following details the history of this process.

Mississippi has always permitted adoption by an unmarried adult without regard to sexual orientation. Couples of the same gender were not able to adopt jointly as a result of the state passing a law banning adoption and fostering by same-sex couples in 2000. By 2015, Mississippi was the only state that continued to enforce such a ban.

In February 2013, Ronnie Musgrove, who as governor in 2000 had signed the ban, described how his views had changed and that the law "made it harder for an untold number of children to grow up in happy, healthy homes in Mississippi–and that breaks my heart". On August 12, 2015, the Campaign for Southern Equality, the Family Equality Council, and four Mississippi same-sex couples filed a lawsuit challenging that ban in federal court. Their complaint noted that as of 2014 29% of Mississippi households headed by a same-sex-couple included children under the age of 18, the highest percentage in any U.S. state.

On March 31, 2016, U.S. District Judge Daniel Porter Jordan III issued a preliminary injunction striking down Mississippi's ban on adoption rights for same-sex couples, declaring it unconstitutional. A spokeswoman for the state's Attorney General responded to the ruling by stating; "We respect the district court's analysis of the law and will consult with the Department of Human Services on what options to take going forward." Any appeal was considered unlikely to succeed. The ruling made Mississippi the final state in the United States to allow same-sex couples to adopt. The ban was officially declared dead on May 2, 2016 after a deadline passed at midnight for Mississippi officials to appeal the court ruling. One of the plaintiffs, Susan Hrostowski along with her wife, Kathryn Garner, said: "I've been waiting 16 years to be able to adopt my son, so I'm overjoyed about that."

Lesbian couples have access to in vitro fertilization. State law recognizes the non-genetic, non-gestational mother as a legal parent to a child born via donor insemination, but only if the parents are married. Surrogacy is neither expressly prohibited nor permitted in Mississippi. However, courts are generally favorable to surrogacy, but may require the couple to be married with at least one partner who is genetically related to the child. Same-sex couples are treated in the same manner as opposite-sex couples in using the gestational or traditional surrogacy process.

Discrimination protections

Mississippi statutes do not address discrimination based on gender identity or sexual orientation.

The state capital of Jackson and the cities of Clarksdale, Holly Springs, and Magnolia have approved ordinances banning discrimination based on sexual orientation and gender identity in public and private employment, housing and public accommodations. In addition, Hattiesburg, Oxford, and Starkville have similar protections but for city employees only.

Bostock v. Clayton County

On June 15, 2020, the U.S. Supreme Court ruled in Bostock v. Clayton County, consolidated with Altitude Express, Inc. v. Zarda, and R.G. & G.R. Harris Funeral Homes Inc. v. Equal Employment Opportunity Commission that discrimination in the workplace on the basis of sexual orientation or gender identity is discrimination on the basis of sex, and Title VII therefore protects LGBT employees from discrimination.

Religious freedom
The Mississippi Student Religious Liberties Act of 2013 protects the views of students in any educational institution from being reprimanded for their religious views.

The Mississippi Religious Freedom Restoration Act protects religious people from legal repercussions if they verbally condemn the "lifestyle" or "actions" of LGBT persons.

Passed in 2016, the Religious Liberty Accommodations Act protects the beliefs that "marriage should be the union of one man and one woman, sexual relations are properly reserved to such a marriage, and male and female refer to an individual's biological sex as objectively determined by anatomy and genetics at time of birth". Soon after the bill's passage, many states and cities banned public travel to Mississippi. The bill was due to go into effect on July 1, 2016. On June 30, however, U.S. District Court Judge Carlton W. Reeves issued a preliminary injunction blocking the law. On June 23, 2017, the Fifth Circuit Court of Appeals lifted the injunction as the plaintiffs in the case lacked standing, thus allowing the law to go into effect.

Local non-discrimination resolutions
The following cities have passed resolutions supporting the LGBT community:
 Hattiesburg on February 18, 2014
 Oxford on March 4, 2014
 Magnolia on April 22, 2014
 Greenville on April 29, 2014
 Bay St. Louis on May 6, 2014
 Waveland on May 21, 2014
 Jackson on June 3, 2014
 Greenwood on April 19, 2016
 Rosedale; local non-discrimination ordinance implemented on the 17th June, 2021.

Starkville passed a similar resolution in January 2014. On January 6, 2015, however, the Starkville City Council voted 5–2 to repeal the equality resolution. On January 8, 2015, Mayor Parker Wiseman vetoed the measure, but on January 21, 2015 the City Council voted 5–2 to override Wiseman's veto and repeal the equality resolution.

Transgender rights

Healthcare 

On February 28, 2023, Governor Tate Reeves signed a bill to ban gender affirming healthcare for any trans person under 18 years old, which both houses of the state legislature had passed earlier that month. Its authors call it the “Regulate Experiment Adolescent Procedures" (REAP) Act. Utah and South Dakota had already passed similar bills within the preceding month, making Mississippi the third state to do so.

Identity documents 
Generally, transgender people in Mississippi are allowed to change the gender marker on their identity documents.

The Real You Act of 2022 
On January 17, 2022, state senator Chad McMahan introduced a bill to prevent some people from changing their name and gender. If the bill passed, it would have:

 No incarcerated person convicted of a state or federal crime would be permitted to petition for a name change unless the request came from the district attorney, county sheriff, or state Department of Corrections commissioner or chaplain.
 No minor would be allowed to petition for a gender change without three written letters from a physician, psychiatrist, and chancery clerk.

The bill was referred a judiciary committee and died on the Senate calendar in February 2022.

Birth certificate 
The Mississippi Vital Records will issue an amended birth certificate with a new name and gender marker "upon receipt of a certified court order, a medical statement that attests to the reassignment, and the required fee." However, the amended birth certificate will display both the current and former information.

Driver's license 
Since November 1, 2021, to update a driver's license, applicants must fill out a "Gender Designation Form" and have it signed by a professional such as a physician or psychotherapist. Previously, the Department of Public Safety required a court order or an amended birth certificate.

Sports ban
In February and March 2021, the Mississippi Legislature passed a bill (known as SB 2536) by a vote of 34–9 in the Senate and 81–28 in the House to ban transgender individuals from participating in athletic sports or Olympic events which correlate with their gender identity. According to the bill, any athlete whose sex someone disputes will have to provide a signed statement from a physician attesting to their genitalia, DNA, and hormone levels. Governor Tate Reeves signed the bill into law on March 11, with it expected to go into force on July 1.

Hate crime law
State law does not address hate crimes based on gender identity or sexual orientation. However, federal law has covered both categories since 2009, when the Matthew Shepard and James Byrd Jr. Hate Crimes Prevention Act was signed into law by President Barack Obama. Hate crimes committed on the basis of the victim's sexual orientation or gender identity can thus be prosecuted in federal court.

Freedom of expression
In 2018, the city of Starkville banned an LGBT pride parade from taking place. Following backlash and legal action, the city allowed the event to happen. It was held on March 24, 2018 and was the largest parade in the city's history, with about 3,000 people in attendance.

Summary table

See also
LGBT rights in the United States

References

LGBT rights in Mississippi